The Parliamentary Labour Club, later the National Labour Club, was a club for officials of the British Labour Party. It was founded in 1924.

History 
Beatrice Webb had founded the Half Circle Club in 1921, as a social club for the wives of Labour Members of Parliament and trade union leaders. The Labour Party had been previously unsuccessful in establishing any central Labour club, in London; earlier attempts by Arthur Henderson, and Herbert Morrison had failed. Also established by Webb, the Parliamentary Labour Club was opened in May 1924, with donations from Liberal Sir Arthur Acland and wealthy Labour Party members. The Club struggled to attract members; few Labour MPs or trade unionists joined. The Club changed its name to the National Labour Club in 1928. In 1930, Webb wrote about the membership of the Club in her diary, remarking that one could find "short-haired typists from the trade union offices, M.P.s, Cabinet Ministers, all being served in strict order to their coming, and all chatting together indiscriminately".

Membership 
The following categories of people were eligible for membership, as long as they were individual members of the Labour Party:
Labour Members of Parliament
Endorsed Labour Party candidates
Members of Labour Advisory Committees
Members of the Half Circle Club
Members and staff of the General Council of the Labour Party
Members and staff of the Labour Party National Executive
Staff of the Parliamentary Labour Party
Other salaried staff of the Labour Party
Salaried officials of trade unions
Salaried officials of organisations affiliated to the Labour Party
Labour aldermen and councillors on local authorities
Presidents, chairmen and secretaries of divisional and local Labour parties
Secretaries of trades councils
Presidents and secretaries of Labour party women's sections
Spouses, children and siblings of any of the above

People who had rendered distinguished service to the Labour Party could also be elected to membership.

The club had premises at 11 Tufton Street, London.

See also 
1917 Club

Footnotes

References 

Parliamentary Labour Club Rules, 1924.

History of the Labour Party (UK)
Organisations associated with the Labour Party (UK)
Organisation of the Labour Party (UK)
Organizations established in 1924
Clubs and societies in London
1924 establishments in the United Kingdom